Bomi is a county in the northwestern portion of the West African nation of Liberia. The county was  established in 1984.

Bomi is one of 15 counties that comprise the first-level of administrative division in the nation. Tubmanburg serves as the county's capital. The County has four administrive districts. 

Bomi is bordered on the northwest by Grand Cape Mount County, on the northeast by Gbarpolu and Bong Counties, on the southeast by Montserrado County and on the southwest by the Atlantic Ocean. As of the 2008 Liberian census, Bomi had a population of 84,119, making it the nation's eleventh most populous county.

History
From 1822 until the Liberian Declaration of Independence from the American Colonization Society on July 26, 1847 some 3,198 freed slaves and slaves from the Lesser Antilles, who had escaped from their slaveholders or born free left the Caribbean islands and came to Liberia with the help and support from the American Colonization Society and other organizations. The former Caribbean slaves came to Liberia to live a better life, to be free and for self-government. The first batch of slaves who left the Caribbean islands was from Barbados, some 500 to 1,000 freed Caribbean slaves arrived as settlers to Liberia. The second set of settlers who came from the Caribbean islands was 345 from Trinidad and Tobago, followed by 620 from Saint Vincent and the Grenadines, another 350 from Saint Kitts and Nevis, the last two groups of settlers who left the Caribbean islands was 483 from Grenada, and the last group of settlers from Saint Lucia 400 former Caribbean slaves. As job opportunities and development growth increase the former slaves moved through Grand Cape Mount, Bomi, Montserrado County, Margibi County and other regions of Liberia.

Bomi County, formerly known as Bomi Territory, was once part of Montserrado County. The military regime of Samuel Doe established Bomi County in 1983.  A legislative act later confirmed the County as being a separate entity. Bomi means “LIGHT” in the Gola language, recognizing the County's status as the first site for iron ore mining in Liberia.

The Liberia Mining Company extracted iron ore in the territory during the 1950s and 1960s. The company closed its operations in 1979.

Geography, climate and seasons
The County is bordered on the northwest by Grand Cape Mount County, on the northeast by Gbarpolu and Bong Counties, on the southeast by Montserrado County and on the southwest by the Atlantic Ocean. 

The Lofa River forms the boundary between Bomi and Grand Cape Mount Counties. A tributary of the river forms part of the boundary between Bomi and Gbarpolu Counties. The Saint Paul River forms part of the boundary between Bomi and Montserrado Counties. 

Bomi County's climate is generally warm throughout the year. There are two seasons in the year - the rainy season which begins in April and ends in October and the dry season from November to March.

Demographics

The 2008 Liberian census showed that Bomi County had a population of 84,119, making it the eleventh most populous county in Liberia. The County had at that time a population density of 113 persons per square mile (44 persons per km2). 

Bomi contains five chiefdoms and 18 clans. The County's principal ethnic groups are Gola, Dei, Mandinka and Kpelle.

Resources and economy
Bomi County's resources include diamond, rubber, timber, iron ore, gold, water, stone, sand and fertile agriculture land. 
70% of the population engage in agricultural activities, including the production or exploitation of rice (the staple food), cassava, sweet potatoes, eddoes, plantains, vegetables, rubber, palm oil and livestock or in fisheries. 20% participate in business and trading. Local governments employ 10%. The Sime Darby rubber plantation, the second largest in Liberia, is located within the County.

Administrative districts
Bomi is divided into four administrative districts: 
Dewoin District
Klay District
Senjeh District
Seuhn Mecca District

References

External links

Voting Among the Ruins
Liberia: Bomi County Launches "Operation Breakthrough"

 
Counties of Liberia
1984 establishments in Liberia